Miloš Marković (Serbian Cyrillic: Милош Марковић; born 10 December 1986) is a Serbian footballer who plays as a right-back.

Career
Miloš Marković, born in Belgrade, began his career in his native Serbia playing for FK Radnički Beograd and FK Bežanija as youth and than for FK IMT as his first senior club. He moved to FK Bežanija, his first professional club in the 2008–09 season and made 66 caps while played in Serbian First League. In 2011, he moved to FK Novi Pazar playing in the Serbian Superliga. He made his debut in Serbian SuperLiga playing against FK Partizan. In 2012, he moved to FK Mladost Lučani and played in Serbian First League. After FK Mladost Lučani he played also for many Serbian SuperLiga teams like FK Radnik Surdulica, FK Borac Čačak, FK Rad Belgrade, FK Dinamo Vranje and also for Premier League of Bosnia and Herzegovina one of the biggest clubs FK Borac Banja Luka and Liga I FC Ceahlaul Piatra Neamt.

References

External links
 
 Profile at utaknica.rs

1986 births
Living people
Footballers from Belgrade
Serbian footballers
FK Novi Pazar players
FK Bežanija players
FK Borac Banja Luka players
FK Rad players
CSM Ceahlăul Piatra Neamț players
FK Radnik Surdulica players
FK Borac Čačak players
FK Mladost Lučani players
FK Dinamo Vranje players
Serbian SuperLiga players
Serbian First League players
Premier League of Bosnia and Herzegovina players
Liga I players
Serbian expatriate footballers
Association football wingers
Association football fullbacks
Expatriate footballers in Romania
Expatriate footballers in Bosnia and Herzegovina
Serbian expatriate sportspeople in Romania
Serbian expatriate sportspeople in Bosnia and Herzegovina